The Military Road is a name given locally to part of the B6318 road in Northumberland, England, which runs from Heddon-on-the-Wall  in the east to Greenhead  in the west.

It should not be confused with the Roman-built Military Way adjoining Hadrian's Wall to the south. Nor should it be confused with other 'Military Roads' constructed in Scotland under Field Marshal Wade who was responsible for a series of highways in Scotland. These include roads at Corrieyairack Pass and Aberfeldy.

For much of its length, the Military Road is straight and resembles a Roman road. However, the term "military road" comes from the impetus to build a road suitable for the movement of military equipment and vehicles between Newcastle and Carlisle. This was largely in response to the poor conditions encountered on the road by Hanoverian forces under Field Marshal Wade in 1746 when trying to suppress the Jacobites fighting for Bonnie Prince Charlie in the North. The struggle of the troops under Field Marshal Wade, and his association with other 'Military Roads' in Scotland, is likely to be the source of the claim that he was also responsible for this route. 

The road is notable as it runs alongside Hadrian's Wall for much of its length, and long stretches of the road are built on the foundations of the wall.

History 

The construction of the historical Military Road, on which the B6318 partially runs, is cited as one of the most damaging single attacks on Hadrian's Wall. The decision to improve road communications was taken in response to the difficulty moving the Hanoverian army under General George Wade from Newcastle to Carlisle in 1746; the journey reportedly taking almost a week between November 16th and 22nd. In light of the poor condition of the roads, an improved route was considered as a matter of urgency. Construction began in mid-1751, and was completed in 1758.

The topography west of Sewingshields made it necessary for the road to diverge from the wall, thus preserving much of what remains of the wall today.

See also
Stanegate

References 

 Smith, GH, Excavations near Hadrian's Wall at Tarraby Lane 1976, Britannia, Vol. 9 (1978), pp 19–56
Lawson, W, The origin of the Military Road from Newcastle to Carlisle. Archaeologia Aeliana Series 4. Vol 44 (1966), pp. 185-207.

Roads in Northumberland
Roads in England
Hadrian's Wall
Military roads